Charles Manly (May 13, 1795May 1, 1871) was a lawyer who served as the 31st governor of the U.S. state of North Carolina from 1849 to 1851. He was the last member of the Whig Party to hold the office. After one two-year term, Manly was defeated in the 1850 election by Democrat David S. Reid, whom Manly had defeated in 1848. He was the last sitting governor of North Carolina to lose re-election until Pat McCrory in 2016.

He was the brother of Matthias Evans Manly. He was also an ancestor of Alexander Manly, the African-American editor of the Wilmington Daily Record. He attended the University of North Carolina at Chapel Hill.

External links
UNC Chapel Hill
North Carolina Historical Marker

1795 births
1871 deaths
Burials at City Cemetery (Raleigh, North Carolina)
Governors of North Carolina
North Carolina Whigs
Whig Party state governors of the United States
19th-century American politicians